The Infineon XC2000 family is a 16-bit microcontroller that can be found in  automotive applications including transmissions, hybrid applications, driver assistant systems and engine management.

Key features
The XC2000 family uses the Infineon proprietary C166 16-bit in a version which also contains a 32-bit MAC unit. Core frequency ranges from 40 to 100 MHz, embedded flash from 32 KB to 1.6 MB, RAM up to 138 KB. The microcontroller containing an embedded voltage regulator can run from a single power supply between 3 and 5 V.

Architecture

CPU
The Central Processing Unit (CPU) of the XC2000 microcontroller family is principally fetching and decoding instructions, to supply, perform operations and store calculated result on the operands for the arithmetic logic unit (ALU) and the MAC unit.

As the CPU is the main engine of the XC2000 microcontroller, it is also affected by certain actions of the peripheral subsystem. Because a five-stage processing pipeline (plus two-stage fetch pipeline) is implemented in the XC2000, up to five instructions can be processed in parallel. Most instructions of the XC2000 are executed in one single clock cycle due to this parallelism.

Peripherals
 One or two analog to digital converters with up to 30 channels, 600 ns conversion time, up to 10 or 12-bit resolution
 up to four units for PWM generation (CCU6) with 16-bit resolution
 up to six CAN nodes with up to 256 message objects
 up to 10 Universal Serial Interface Controller channels for software defined serial interfaces (SPI, UART, I2C, I2S)
 External bus unit

Development tools

Evaluation kits
There are "Easy Kits" for evaluation of the controller features and "Application Kits" as quick start for specific applications available. Main applications are in the industrial field like electric motor control, automation and solar inverters.

Free tools
 DAVE™ ("Digital Application virtual Engineer") is a free tool to configure low-level drivers and automatically generate source code.
 DAVE™ Drive  is a free tool for automated motor control generation which generates motor specific control codes like field-oriented control, sinusoidal or block commutation or V/Hz speed control.
 Free Tasking compiler program

Third-party tools
 Tasking compiler toolset 
 Hitex debugger
 PLS debugger

References

Microcontrollers